Pasinler or Basean (formerly Hasankale and Hesenqele, meaning "the fortress of Hasan"), is a town in Erzurum Province, Turkey on the Aras River.

It was the birthplace of the Ottoman poet Nef'i. The old name "Hasankale" could be based upon the Aq Qoyunlu ruler Uzun Hasan or upon Hasan the governor of the region in the 1330s or after Küçük Hasan, grandson of Coban, who attacked the town in 1340.

History
The first ancient kingdom who had a control of this territory is Urartu, who called it Biani. One of some versions of the name Pasinler - it is derived from the ancient tribe called Phasians (Phazians). The name of this tribe seems to have survived in latter-day regional toponyms – Armenian Basean, Greek Phasiane, Georgian Basiani, and Turkish Pasin.
Based upon pottery finds, Pasinler was part of the Kingdom of Urartu during the Iron Age.

Territory of Basean belonged to Greater Armenia from 4th century BC to 5th century AD and was part of Armenian province - Ayrarat. According to the Armenian chronicler Movses Khorenatsi (5th century), this land was the family estate of the Armenian Ordun dynasty, established by Armenian King Vagharshak, who ruled in 117 - 138/140 AD. In the story of the Armenian chronicler Favstos Buzand (5th century), the thief of the Orduni clan attacked the power of King Khosrov III, seizing and destroying the royal house, as a result of which the princes of the Orduni clan were killed by order of Khosrov. Their ancestral lands, located in the area of Basean, with all their bounds, were given to the bishop of Basean, a native of Ordor. After 428 AD this land became part of the Sasanian Armenia, right up to the Arab invasions in 7th-9th centuries. In 9th century Basean became part of Bagratid Armenia.

In the 10th century, the border between the Byzantine Empire and expanding early georgian Kingdom of Tao-Klarjeti went along the Aras river, therefore part of northern Basean/Basiani became a domain of the Georgian Bagratids. In 1001, after the death of David Kuropalates, Basean/Basiani were inherited by Byzantine Emperor Basil II, who annexed the Armenian lands (Tayk/Tao, Basean/Basiani), captured by King David Kuropalates to Byzantium and organized them into the theme of Iberia with the capital at Theodosiopolis. However, after formation of the Georgian Kingdom, Bagrat’s son George I inherited a longstanding claim to David's succession. While Basil was preoccupied with his Bulgarian campaigns, George gained momentum to invade Tayk/Tao and Basean/Basiani in 1014, which caused unsuccessful Byzantine-Georgian wars. Despite the territorial losses to Basil II, many of the territories ceded to the empire were conquered by the Seljuk Turks in the 1070s-1080s, but were then retaken by the Georgian King David IV. In the 13th century, at Battle of Basian, Georgians defeated the army of the Rum Sultanate.  The province was part of the united Kingdom of Georgia as an ordinary duchy till 1545, when Basiani was conquered by the Ottoman Empire. The Ottomans made Hasankale the centre of a sanjak and entirely rebuild the citadel. They also built several mosques such as Ulucami (1554 repaired in 1836), Sivasli (1388 rebuild in 1912) Yeni (16th century rebuild in 1810) and baths. Other sights are the Coban bridge likely built in 1297 by a notable Ilkhanid Mongol named Coban and which was later restored several times. There are also two Islamic tombs nearby the town, Ferrah Hatun built in 1324 and the other likely in the 13th century. The nearby location of Avnik, has a ruined citadel with an old Muslim cemetery and mosque.

During the 19th century, several Russo-Ottoman wars took place in this region and as a consequence many Armenians emigrated from this region to Russian held territory in Transcaucasia. When World War broke out the Russians advanced to the plain of Pasinler but quickly retreated together with many of the local Armenian population, some 4,000 remained and were deported. Between 1915 and 1917 it was occupied by Russia and then, after the Bolshevik revolution, held by Armenian forces. Turkish forces regained control of the town on 13 March 1918.

People from Pasinler 
 Fethullah Gülen, Turkish preacher, Leader of the Gülen movement, Lives in Saylorsburg, Pennsylvania.

Notes

External links
 "Pasinler Thermal Resort" Turkish Ministry of Culture and Tourism
 Map of Pasinler area from MapWizard
 Map of Pasinler area from Bugday TaTuTa

Populated places in Erzurum Province
Towns in Turkey

cbk-zam:Pasinler District
sw:Pasinler District
mrj:Пасинлер